Geneva Township is a civil township of Midland County in the U.S. state of Michigan. The population was 1,137 at the 2000 census.

Communities 
A post office operated from November 5, 1873, until April 27, 1984. The settlement was also called Buttonville or Button, for William R. Button, who was closely associated with its development.

Geography

Demographics
As of the census of 2000, there were 1,137 people, 436 households, and 340 families residing in the township. The racial makeup of the township was 98.50% White, 0.09% African American, 0.79% Native American, and 0.62% from two or more races. Hispanic or Latino of any race were 1.58% of the population.

There were 436 households, out of which 31.0% had children under the age of 18 living with them, 67.9% were married couples living together, 6.4% had a female householder with no husband present, and 21.8% were non-families. 17.7% of all households were made up of individuals, and 6.0% had someone living alone who was 65 years of age or older. The average household size was 2.61 and the average family size was 2.94.

In the township the population was spread out, with 25.0% under the age of 18, 6.9% from 18 to 24, 29.2% from 25 to 44, 25.9% from 45 to 64, and 13.1% who were 65 years of age or older. The median age was 38 years. For every 100 females, there were 104.1 males. For every 100 females age 18 and over, there were 103.1 males.

The median income for a household in the township was $41,908, and the median income for a family was $43,906. Males had a median income of $35,469 versus $22,500 for females. The per capita income for the township was $17,479. About 7.3% of families and 8.5% of the population were below the poverty line, including 8.3% of those under age 18 and 5.6% of those age 65 or over.

References

Townships in Midland County, Michigan
Townships in Michigan
1873 establishments in Michigan
Populated places established in 1873